= Latio Ramba =

South Sudanese politician

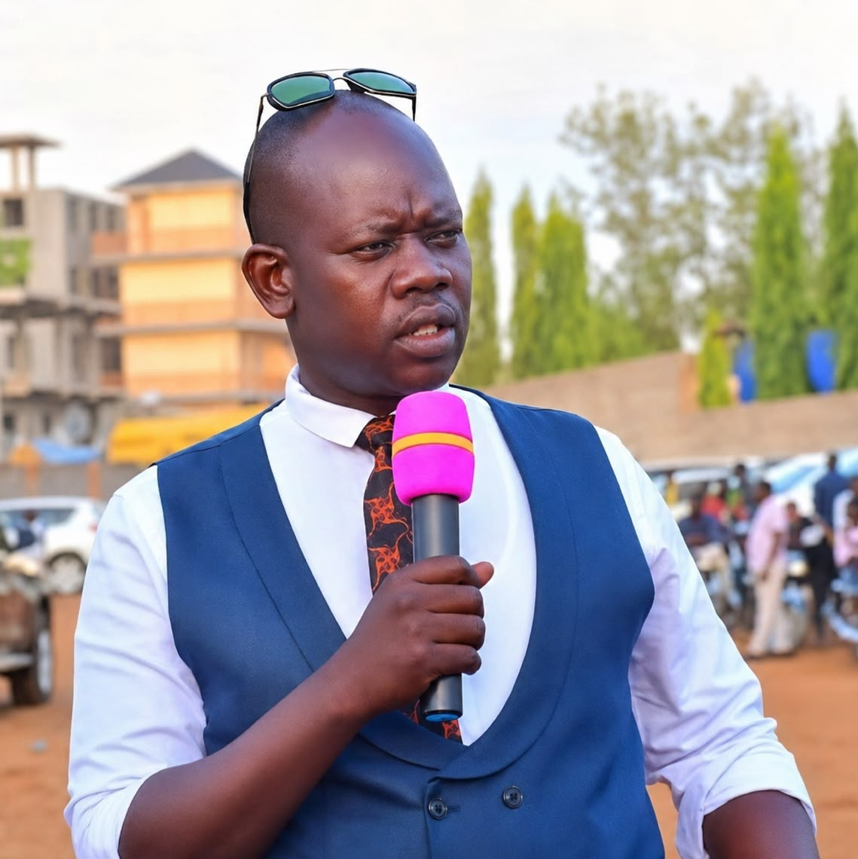

Minister of Roads and Bridges for Central Equatoria State
- Incumbent
- Assumed office March 2026

Latio Paul Abbas, also known as Latio Ramba, is a South Sudanese politician. He is currently the Minister of Roads and Bridges for Central Equatoria State in the Transitional Government of National Unity. Latio was appointed to the position by South Sudan's President, Salva Kiir Mayardit in March 2026.

Prior to his ministerial position, Latio previously served as the Deputy Commissioner General of the state revenue authority and Commissioner General of the Central Equatoria State Insurance and Regulatory Authority, respectively.

== Political Career ==
Latio Ramba is also a member of the ruling Sudan People's Liberation Movement (SPLM), and is currently the SPLM's Central Equatoria State Secretary for Culture, Information and Communication. He was named in the list by then State Governor, Gen. Augustino Jadalla Wani in 2025.
